A labial frenectomy is a form of frenectomy performed on the lip.

The labial frenulum often attaches to the center of the upper lip and between the upper two front teeth. This can cause a large gap and gum recession by pulling the gums off the bone. A labial frenectomy removes the labial frenulum. Orthodontic patients often have this procedure done to assist with closing a front tooth gap. When a denture patient's lips move, the frenulum pulls and loosens the denture which can be uncomfortable. This surgery is often done to help dentures fit better.

References

Lip surgery
Oral and maxillofacial surgery
Oral surgery